Donfried is a surname. Notable people with the surname include:

Karen Donfried, American public policy think tank executive
Karl Paul Donfried (1940–2022), American theologian